Let's Go Native is a 1930 American pre-Code black-and-white musical comedy film, directed by Leo McCarey and released by Paramount Pictures.

Jerry comments on being the only man on an island populated by women, "It was one of the Virgin Islands, but it drifted." The tagline was: "Paramount's wild, merry, mad hilarious farce!"

Cast
Jack Oakie - Voltaire McGinnis
Jeanette MacDonald - Joan Wood
Richard "Skeets" Gallagher - Jerry, King of the Island
James Hall - Wally Wendell
William Austin - Basil Pistol
Kay Francis - Constance Cook
David Newell - Chief Officer Williams
Charles Sellon - Wallace Wendell Sr.
Eugene Pallette - Deputy Sheriff 'Careful' Cuthbert
Iris Adrian - Chorus Girl
Virginia Bruce - Chorus Girl

Soundtrack
 "It Seems To Be Spring"
Lyrics by George Marion Jr.
Music by Richard A. Whiting
Copyright 1930 by Famous Music Corp.
 "Let's Go Native"
Lyrics by George Marion Jr.
Music by Richard A. Whiting
Copyright 1930 by Famous Music Corp.
 "My Mad Moment"
Lyrics by George Marion Jr.
Music by Richard A. Whiting
Copyright 1930 by Famous Music Corp.
 "I've Gotta Yen For You"
Lyrics by George Marion Jr.
Music by Richard A. Whiting
Copyright 1930 by Famous Music Corp.
Sung by Jack Oakie
 "Joe Jazz"
Lyrics by George Marion Jr.
Music by Richard A. Whiting
Copyright 1930 by Famous Music Corp.
Sung by Jack Oakie
 "Pampa Rose"
Lyrics by George Marion Jr.
Music by Richard A. Whiting
Copyright 1930 by Famous Music Corp.
 "Don't I Do?"
Lyrics by George Marion Jr.
Music by Richard A. Whiting
Copyright 1930 by Famous Music Corp.

External links
 
 
 
 
Let's Go Native at the Jeannette and Nelson website
Let's Go Native at OV Guide
Let's Go Native at the NNDB database
Let's Go Native at NYTimes
Let's Go Native at Answers.com
Let's Go Native at Google Books

1930 films
1930 musical comedy films
American musical comedy films
Paramount Pictures films
Films directed by Leo McCarey
American black-and-white films
1930s American films